Doctor Prisoner is a 2019 South Korean television series starring Namkoong Min, Kwon Nara, and Kim Byung-chul. It aired on KBS2's Wednesdays and Thursdays at 22:00 (KST) from March 20 to May 15, 2019.

Synopsis
A skilled doctor is forced to quit working at a hospital after being accused of medical malpractice. He starts working in a prison with the goal of acquiring enough connections to take his revenge.

Cast

Main
 Namkoong Min as Na Yi-je
A talented doctor who always cares about his patients but has to quit the hospital after an incident happens.
 Kwon Nara as Han So-geum
A psychiatrist who works at Taegang Hospital and volunteers in  prison.
 Kim Byung-chul as Seon Min-sik 
A medical director who works at the prison.
 Choi Won-young as Lee Jae-joon
 Primary successor to major conglomerate Taegang Group.

Supporting

Taegang Group's family
 Jin Hee-kyung as Mo Yi-ra 
 A former actress who becomes the second wife of Lee Duk-sung.  
 Lee Da-in as Lee Jae-in 
 Youngest daughter of the Taegang family who has both looks and brains. In order to protect her family, she enters law school to become a lawyer. 
 Park Eun-seok as Lee Jae-hwan
Second son of the Taegang family. His insecurity as the son of the second wife makes him a troublemaker.

People at West Seoul Prison
 Lee Min-young as Bok Hye-soo
A medical pharmacist. Na Yi-je saved her brother when the latter was an inmate.
 Lee Jun-hyeok as Go Young-cheol
A funny medical doctor who is secretly working for Lee Jae-joon.
 Kang Shin-il as Kim Sang-chun
An inmate who was sentenced to life in prison.
 Jang Joon-nyoung as Tae Choon-Ho
 Friend of the inmate Kim Sang-Chun	
 Lee Yong-joon as Hyun Jae-min
 Lee Hyun-jyun as Supervisor Ham Gil-Sun	 
 Park Soo-young as Supervisor Oh Cheol-Min
 Kang Hong-seok as Shin Hyun-Sang
 The Head of the Thug inmates group

Others
 Jang Hyun-sung as  Prosector Jung Wi-sik
 Bae Yoon-kyung as Jung Se-jin
 Shin Ha-young as Na Yi-hyeon	
 Kim Jung-nan as Oh Jung-Hee
 Choi Deok-moon as Center Chief	of Taegang Hospital
 Chae Dong-hyun as Choi Dong-Hoon
 Doctor at Taegang Hospital	
 Kim Dae-ryeong as Choi Jung-Woo
 Secretary of Lee Jae-Joon	
 Woo Mi-hwa as Kim Young-Sun	
 Wife of Director Seon Min-sik	 	 
 Kang Ji-hoo as Prosector Kang
 Nam Kyoung-eub as Congressman Jung Min-Je	
 Oh Dong-min as Moon Yong-Sung	
 Jung In-gyeom as Seon Min-Joong
 Ryeoun as Han Bit
 Younger brother of Han So-geum.
 Song Duk-ho as Surgical intern

Special appearances
 Park Ji-yeon as Ha-Eun's mother (ep.1-2)
 Lee Joo-seung as Kim Seok-woo (Ep. 3, 9-12)
 Kim Ji-eun as Oh Min-jeong (Ep. 10, 12)
 Park Se-hyun as  Kim Hye-Jin
 Yang Dae-hyuk as Kang Sun-woo	
 Bae Seung-ik as Hong Nam-Pyo

Production
The first script reading took place in January 2019 at KBS Broadcasting Station in Yeouido, South Korea.

Original soundtrack

Part 1

Part 2

Part 3

Part 4

Viewership
 In this table,  represent the lowest ratings and  represent the highest ratings.
 N/A denotes that the rating is not known.

Awards and nominations

Notes

References

External links
  
 
 
 

Korean Broadcasting System television dramas
Korean-language television shows
2019 South Korean television series debuts
2019 South Korean television series endings
South Korean medical television series